Anthony Farnell (born 1978), known as the Woodhouse Warrior, was born in Manchester and grew up in Failsworth, Greater Manchester. He is a former WBU middleweight champion. He  retired from the ring in 2004 to concentrate on training.

It was announced on 31 October 2008 that Farnell would train World Amateur Lightweight Champion, Frankie Gavin for his entry into the professional ranks.

References

External links
 BoxRec Bio
 Welcome to Failsworth: Farnell Bio

1978 births
Living people
English male boxers
Middleweight boxers
People from Failsworth
Boxers from Manchester